Trochaclis versiliensis is a species of sea snail, a marine gastropod mollusk in the family Ataphridae.

Description
The length of the shell varies between 1.2 mm and 1.7 mm.

Distribution
This marine species occurs in the western part of the Mediterranean Sea and the adjacent region of the Atlantic Ocean.

References

  Gofas, S.; Le Renard, J.; Bouchet, P. (2001). Mollusca, in: Costello, M.J. et al. (Ed.) (2001). European register of marine species: a check-list of the marine species in Europe and a bibliography of guides to their identification. Collection Patrimoines Naturels, 50: pp. 180–213

External links
 

Ataphridae
Gastropods described in 1992